Outlawed is a 1929 American silent Western film directed by Eugene Forde and starring Tom Mix, Sally Blane and Frank Clark.

Cast
 Tom Mix as Tom Manning 
 Sally Blane as Anne  
 Frank Clark as Seth  
 Albert J. Smith as Dervish  
 Ethan Laidlaw as McCasky  
 Barney Furey as Sagebrush  
 Al Ferguson as Sheriff

References

Bibliography 
 Jensen, Richard D. The Amazing Tom Mix: The Most Famous Cowboy of the Movies. 2005.

External links 
 

1929 Western (genre) films
1920s English-language films
Films directed by Eugene Forde
1929 films
American black-and-white films
Film Booking Offices of America films
Silent American Western (genre) films
1920s American films